This is a list of National Highways of India by state, prior to their renumbering in 2010–11. For the list of current highway numbers by state see List of National Highways in India by state.

Andaman & Nicobar

Andhra Pradesh

Arunachal Pradesh

Assam

Bihar

Chandigarh

Chhattisgarh

Delhi

Goa

Gujarat

Haryana

Himachal Pradesh

Jammu and Kashmir

Jharkhand

Karnataka

Kerala

Madhya Pradesh

Maharashtra

Meghalaya

Mizoram

Nagaland

Odisha

Punjab

Puducherry

Rajasthan

Sikkim

Tamil Nadu

Telangana

Tripura

Uttar Pradesh

Uttarakhand

West Bengal

See also
 List of National Highways in India by old highway number
 National Highways Authority of India
 National Highways Development Project

References

External links
  National Highways Authority of India (NHAI)
  Map for all the National Highway
  Ministry of Road Transport and Highways
  National Highways routewise info-Source-Government of India
 

Lists of roads in India
India transport-related lists